Aziza Abdelfattah (born 8 December 1990) is an Egyptian synchronized swimmer who competed in the 2008 Summer Olympics.

References

1990 births
Living people
Egyptian synchronized swimmers
Olympic synchronized swimmers of Egypt
Synchronized swimmers at the 2008 Summer Olympics